Ariarathes X, surnamed Eusebes Philadelphos, "Pious, brother-loving" (Ariaráthēs Eusebḗs Philádelphos), was the king of Cappadocia from c. 42 BC to 36 BC. He was of Persian and Greek ancestry. His father was King Ariobarzanes II of Cappadocia and his mother was Queen Athenais. He became king after his brother Ariobarzanes III Philoromaios was killed. His rule did not last long as Mark Antony of Rome removed and executed him, replacing him with Sisines, who became Archelaus of Cappadocia.

References

Kings of Cappadocia
36 BC deaths
People executed by the Roman Republic
1st-century BC rulers in Asia
Roman client rulers
1st-century BC executions
Year of birth unknown